Universitas Riau is a public university in Pekanbaru, Riau, Indonesia. It was established on 1 September 1962. Dr. Hj. Sri Indarti, S.E., M.Si serves as the Rector of University of Riau.

Schools

The university has nine faculties:
 Faculty of Social and Political Sciences
 Faculty of Education and Teacher Training
 Faculty of Agriculture
 Faculty of Engineering
 Faculty of Economy and Business
 Faculty of Mathematics and Natural Sciences
 Faculty of Fishery and Marine
 Faculty of Medicine
 Faculty of Law

References

External links
 

Universities in Indonesia
Educational institutions established in 1962
Universities in Riau
Indonesian state universities